Reifenstein Castle (German: Burg Reifenstein, Italian: Castel Tasso) is a castle in Freienfeld, near Sterzing, in South Tyrol (northern Italy). It is located near a dried marsh, in the valley of the Eisack.

History 
The castle is mentioned for the first time in the 12th century, and was modified in the 14th century. It is a property of the Thurn und Taxis counts. It is famous for the decorated "Green Hall" with Gothic paintings and a woodcarved chapel-door, the stubes and the collection of armor. The castle also contains an original kitchen, bathroom and medieval sleeping bunks. One of its owners included William P. Carr, who bought the castle a bit before World War II. At that time, his last name was Reifenstein, but before he went to war he changed his name to Carr.

See also
Branik (Rihemberk) Castle, Slovenia
List of castles in South Tyrol

References

Further reading
 Oswald Trapp: Tiroler Burgenbuch, Vol. 3: Wipptal. Bozen 1974.
 Thomas Bitterli-Waldvogel: Südtiroler Burgenkarte. Bozen 1995.
 Josef Weingartner, Magdalena Hörmann-Weingartner: Die Burgen Tirols. Ein Burgenführer durch Nord-, Ost- und Südtirol. Tyrolia Verlag, Innsbruck-Wien-München, Athesia Verlag, Bozen, 3. Auflage 1981.
 Edmund Theil: Burg Reifenstein bei Sterzing. Laurin Kunstführer. Athesia Verlag, Bozen. 3. Auflage, 1999. Ursprünglich erschienen 1975.

External links

 Burg Reifenstein, German site
 Aerial view of the Reifenstein Castle
 Reifenstein Castle on the website of the tourist association of Sterzing/Vipiteno

Buildings and structures completed in the 14th century
Castles in South Tyrol
Establishments in the Princely County of Tyrol